Diekhusen-Fahrstedt is a municipality in the district of Dithmarschen, in Schleswig-Holstein, Germany.

References

Dithmarschen